There are multiple notable hotels known as the Orient Hotel. These include:

 Orient Hotel, Brisbane, in Queensland, Australia
 Orient Hotel (Fremantle), in Fremantle, Western Australia
 Orient Hotel, The Rocks, in The Rocks, Sydney, New South Wales, Australia

See also
 Oriental Hotel (disambiguation)